Khordad (in Persian خرداد) was a Persian language newspaper published in Tehran, Iran.

History and profile
The publisher of Khordad was Abdollah Noori. It was shut down by Iran Special Clerical Court in November 1999, and its publisher and editor-in-chief, Abdollah Noori, was sentenced to jail for five years on 27 November 1999. Khordad was based in Tehran.

The name of the liberal reformist newspaper was a reference to the 2nd of Khordad Movement, the Iranian reform movement. The word 'Khordad' is the New Persian continuation of Middle Persian Hordad, from Avestan Haurvatat "wholeness."

See also
List of newspapers in Iran

References

1999 disestablishments in Iran
Censorship in Iran
Defunct newspapers published in Iran
Newspapers published in Tehran
Persian-language newspapers
Publications disestablished in 1999
Publications with year of establishment missing